Gustav Bychowski (in Polish, Gustaw Bychowski, born 1895 in Warsaw, Congress Poland, died April 3, 1972 in Fez, Morocco) was a Polish-American psychiatrist, psychoanalyst and author. He studied for a medical degree at the University of Zurich and studied psychiatry at Burghölzli, the University of Zurich's psychiatric hospital. He then studied psychoanalysis under Sigmund Freud in Vienna before moving back to Warsaw in 1921 and translating Freud's Introduction to Psychoanalysis into Polish.

During his career, he wrote a large number of books on psychoanalysis including Evil in Man: The Anatomy of Hate and Violence and Dictators and Disciples from Caesar to Stalin. The latter looks specifically at Julius Caesar, Oliver Cromwell, Maximilien Robespierre, Adolf Hitler and Joseph Stalin.

The psychoanalyst Frank M. Lachmann describes Bychowski as not being a traditional Freudian: "Here was a Freudian analyst who was clearly more interested in connecting with the patient and finding areas of strength than in demonstrating how clever he could be in eliciting psychopathology". Lachmann writes that Bychowski eventually adopted similar views to that of Heinz Kohut.

Amongst his patients was noted American filmmaker James Toback.

Selected bibliography 
 Specialized Techniques in Psychotherapy (ed. with J. Louise Despert), New York: Basic Books, 1952.
 Zur Psychopathologie der Brandstiftung. Zurich: O. Fussli, 1919
 Zur Psychopathologie der Brandstiftung. Schweizer Archiv für Neurologie und Psychiatrie 5, p. 29–55, 1919
 Űber das Fehlen der Wahmehmung der eigenen Blindheit bei zwei Kriegsverletzten. Neurologisches Centralblatt 39, p. 354–357, 1920
 Wissenschaft und Anthroposophie. Bemerkungen zum Aufsatz von Glaus ueber die anthroposophischen Kurse in Dornach. Schweizerische medizinische Wochenschrift 16, p. 377–378, 1921
 Autismus und Regression in modernen Kunstbestrebungen. Allgemeine Zeitschrift für Psychiatrie und psychisch-gerichtliche Medicin 78, s. 102–121, 1922
 Eine Gesichtsillusion als Ausdruck der ambivalenten Ubertragung. Int. Zsch. Psychoanal. 8, p. 337–339, 1922
 
 
 Zur Frage nach den Beziehungen zwischen der Psyche und dem weiblichen Genitalsystem. Monatsschrift für Psychiatrie und Neurologie 59, p. 209–214, 1925
 Schizofrenja w świetle psychoanalizy. Rocznik Psychjatryczny 5, p. 49–78, 1927
 W sprawie psychoterapji schizofrenji. Rocznik Psychjatryczny 8, p. 57–69, 1928
 Űber Psychotherapie der Schizophrenie. Der Nervenarzt 1(8), p. 478–487, 1928
 Słowacki i jego dusza. Studium psychoanalityczne. Warszawa-Kraków: Wydawnictwo J. Mortkowicza, 1930
 O wychowaniu seksualnem. Warszawa: Polskie Towarzystwo Eugeniczne, 1930
 Marcel Proust als Dichter der psychologischen Analyse. Psychoanal. Bewegung 4, s. 323–344, 1932
 O pewnych zagadnieniach schizofrenji w świetle patologji mózgowej. Rocznik Psychjatryczny 21, p. 28–44, 1933
 Psychoanaliza na usługach wychowania dzieci moralnie zaniedbanych. Szkoła Specjalna 11 (2/4), 1934/1935
 Przestępca w świetle psychoanalizy. Rocznik Psychjatryczny 24, p. 30–52, 1935
 Certain Problems of Schizophrenia in the Light of Cerebral Pathology. Journal of Nervous and Mental Disease 81 (3), p. 280–298, 1935
 O legastenji, 1935
 Zasady analizy psychiatrycznej zaburzeń ogniskowych. Rocznik Psychjatryczny 25, 110–134, 1936
 Rozmowa z Freudem. Wiadomości Literackie 20 (652), p. 4, 10.4.1936
 Bychowski G., Kaczyński M., Konopka C., Szczytt K. Doświadczenia i dotychczasowe wyniki leczenia insuliną chorób psychicznych. Rocznik Psychiatryczny 28, s. 105–135, 1936
 Frontalsyndrome und Parietookzipitalsyndrome. Jahrbücher für Psychiatrie und Neurologie 54, p. 283–311, 1937
 O diencefalozach. Warszawskie Czasopismo Lekarskie 15 (5, 6), 1938
 Physiology of schizophrenic thinking. Journal of Nervous and Mental Disease 98, p. 368–386, 1942
 The spiritual background of Hitlerism. Journal of Criminal Psychopathology 4, p. 579–598, 1942
 Disorders In The Body-image In The Clinical Pictures Of Psychoses. Journal of Nervous and Mental Disease 97(3), p. 310–335, 1943.
 Some aspects of shock therapy: the structure of psychosis. Journal of Nervous and Mental Disease 102, p. 338–356, 1945
 Dictators and Disciples from Caesar to Stalin; A Psychoanalytic Interpretation of History. New York: International Universities Press, 1948
 On neurotic obesity. Psychoanalytic Review 37, p. 301–319, 1950
 Psychotherapy of Psychosis. New York: Grune and Stratton, 1952
 Specialized Techniques in Psychotherapy. New York: Basic Books, 1952
 Obsessive compulsive façade in schizophrenia. International Journal of Psychoanalysis 47, p. 189–197, 1966
 Evil in Man: The Anatomy of Hate and Violence. New York: Grune and Stratton, 1968

References 

1895 births
American psychiatrists
Physicians from Warsaw
Polish emigrants to the United States
American psychoanalysts
Jewish psychoanalysts
University of Zurich alumni
1972 deaths
Analysands of Siegfried Bernfeld
Translators of Sigmund Freud
Polish psychiatrists